Melrose Mansaray (born 19 July 1972) is a Sierra Leonean sprinter. She competed in the women's 200 metres at the 1992 Summer Olympics and the 1996 Summer Olympics of Atlanta.

References

External links
 

1972 births
Living people
Athletes (track and field) at the 1992 Summer Olympics
Athletes (track and field) at the 1996 Summer Olympics
Sierra Leonean female sprinters
Olympic athletes of Sierra Leone
Place of birth missing (living people)
Olympic female sprinters